Georges Fernand Olivier Winckelmans (14 July 1910 – 13 November 1991) was a French footballer and coach. He was born in Lambersart (Nord).

Biography 
Winckelmans played as a midfielder or outside right at the start of the professional era of Olympique Lillois. He participated in the final of the first French Championship on 14 May 1933 at Colombes (O. Lillois-AS Cannes, 4-3). He scored two goals for the nordistes including the winner in the 86th minute. In 1935, he left to play at RC Roubaix. The roubaisien club were vice-champions of Division 2 in 1936 and joined the elite the following season.

Winckelmans returned to Olympique lillois in 1937 where he finished his playing career with the start of the war which stopped all club activities. OL merged in 1941 with their neighbour Iris Club Lillois to form OIC Lille. Winckelmans became coach of this new club, until 1943. After the war he continued his coaching career, at CO Roubaix-Tourcoing in 1947-1948, and then to SO Montpellier, from 1948 to 1950.

Honours 
 Champion of France in 1933 with Olympique Lillois
 Vice-champion of France D2 in 1936 with RC Roubaix

References 

1910 births
1991 deaths
People from Lambersart
French footballers
RC Roubaix players
Ligue 1 players
Ligue 2 players
French football managers
Olympique Lillois managers
Montpellier HSC managers
CO Roubaix-Tourcoing managers
Association football midfielders
Sportspeople from Nord (French department)
Olympique Lillois players
Footballers from Hauts-de-France